The 2010–11 All-Ireland Intermediate Club Football Championship was the eighth staging of the All-Ireland Intermediate Club Football Championship since its establishment by the Gaelic Athletic Association for the 2003–04 season.

The All-Ireland final was played on 12 February 2011 at Croke Park in Dublin, between Lisnaskea Emmetts and St James'. Lisnaskea Emmetts won the match by 1-16 to 0-15 to claim their first ever championship title.

References

2010 in Irish sport
2011 in Irish sport
All-Ireland Intermediate Club Football Championship
All-Ireland Intermediate Club Football Championship